Shumov is a Russian masculine surname, its feminine counterpart is Shumova. It may refer to:

Aleksandr Shumov (born 1991), Russian football player 
Ilya Shumov, (1819–1881) Russian chess master 
Konstantin Shumov (born 1985), Finnish volleyball player
Nadezhda Ziber-Shumova (died 1914), Russian chemist
Vasily Shumov (born 1960), Russian/American artist 

Russian-language surnames